Joseph Fabrice Ondoa Ebogo (born 24 December 1995) is a Cameroonian professional footballer who plays as goalkeeper for Auda and the Cameroon national team.

Having made his debut in 2014 at the age of 18, he represented Cameroon at two Africa Cup of Nations tournaments, winning the 2017 edition.

Club career
Born in Yaoundé, Ondoa joined FC Barcelona in 2009, aged 13, after starting it out at Samuel Eto'o Foundation. He progressed through the club's youth system, and renewed his link with the Catalans until 2017 in 2014.

In June 2014, Ondoa was promoted to the reserves in Segunda División. However, he was only used as a backup to Adrián Ortolá during the campaign.

On 7 January 2016, Ondoa signed a three-and-a-half-year contract with Gimnàstic de Tarragona also in the second level, after rescinding his link with Barça. He was assigned to their farm team, CF Pobla de Mafumet of the third division, and made his senior club debut three days later in a 3–2 loss at CF Reus Deportiu.

On 17 August 2016, Ondoa was loaned to fellow second-tier club Sevilla Atlético, for one year. Second choice to Churripi, he made his professional club debut on 18 March 2017 in a 2–1 win at Real Zaragoza, in which he was punished for timewasting  by conceding a free kick in the penalty area from which Edu García scored; with two minutes remaining he was sent off for a foul with all substitutions having been made, and debutant defender José María Amo had to replace him in goal.

On 11 May 2017, Ondoa signed for the Andalusians until 2020, as the club exercised his buyout clause. After suffering relegation, he signed a four-year deal with Belgian side KV Oostende.

International career
On 24 August 2014, Ondoa was called up to Cameroon for the matches against DR Congo and the Ivory Coast. Thirteen days later he made his international debut, starting in a 2–0 win against the former, and being later praised by manager Volker Finke.

Ondoa and Barcelona teammate Macky Bagnack were included in the 23-man squad for the 2015 Africa Cup of Nations. He played all three of their matches at the tournament in Equatorial Guinea, as they came last in their group.

At the 2017 Africa Cup of Nations in Gabon, Ondoa was again the undisputed goalkeeper for the Indomitable Lions. He was man of the match in their quarter-final win over Senegal, in which he saved the decisive attempt from Sadio Mané in the penalty shootout. Cameroon won the title with a 2–1 victory over Egypt in the final, and he was elected into the Team of the Tournament.

Personal life
His cousin, André Onana, also plays as a goalkeeper for Inter Milan.

Career statistics

Club

International

Honours
Barcelona
 UEFA Youth League: 2013–14

FK Auda
 Latvian Football Cup: 2022

Cameroon
 Africa Cup of Nations: 2017

Individual
 CAF Team of the Tournament: 2017

References

External links
 
 
 

1995 births
Living people
Footballers from Yaoundé
Cameroonian footballers
Association football goalkeepers
Segunda División B players
Belgian Pro League players
Latvian Higher League players
FC Barcelona Atlètic players
CF Pobla de Mafumet footballers
Gimnàstic de Tarragona footballers
Sevilla Atlético players
K.V. Oostende players
Deportivo Alavés players
NK Istra 1961 players
FK Auda players
Cameroon international footballers
Africa Cup of Nations-winning players
2015 Africa Cup of Nations players
2017 Africa Cup of Nations players
2017 FIFA Confederations Cup players
2019 Africa Cup of Nations players
Cameroonian expatriate footballers
Cameroonian expatriate sportspeople in Spain
Cameroonian expatriate sportspeople in Belgium
Cameroonian expatriate sportspeople in Croatia
Cameroonian expatriate sportspeople in Latvia
Expatriate footballers in Spain
Expatriate footballers in Belgium
Expatriate footballers in Croatia
Expatriate footballers in Latvia